Zangel Ab-e Deli (also Romanized as Zangel Āb-e Delī; also known as Zangelāb) is a village in Qaleh-ye Khvajeh Rural District, in the Central District of Andika County, Khuzestan Province, Iran. At the 2006 census, its population was 64, in 10 families.

References 

Populated places in Andika County